Shallow Hal is a 2001 American romantic comedy film starring Gwyneth Paltrow and Jack Black about a shallow man who falls in love with a 300-pound woman after being hypnotized into only seeing a person's inner beauty. Directed by the Farrelly brothers, it was filmed in and around Charlotte, North Carolina as well as Sterling and Princeton, Massachusetts at Wachusett Mountain. The supporting cast features Jason Alexander, Joe Viterelli, and Susan Ward. Shallow Hal was released in theaters on  November 9, 2001 by 20th Century Fox, and grossed $141 million against a $40 million budget.

Plot 
Hal Larson spends his nights being rejected by beautiful women at night clubs with his friend Mauricio. Hal's work life is steady, but he is dismayed after being passed over for a long-sought promotion. Hal is attracted to his neighbor Jill, but she rejects him due to his shallow lifestyle. One day, Hal becomes trapped in an elevator with life coach Tony Robbins, who hypnotizes him into only seeing a person's inner beauty. Hal, not realizing he has been hypnotized, meets Rosemary, the daughter of Steve, the president of the company where he is employed. Rosemary is morbidly obese, but Hal is immediately smitten with her as his hypnosis causes him to see her as a slender and beautiful trophy blonde. Used to being overlooked due to her appearance, Rosemary initially interprets Hal's interest as mockery, but soon realizes his feelings for her are sincere and they begin to date.

Mauricio, worried about Hal's new taste in women, convinces Tony to give him the trigger phrase to undo the hypnosis, which is "Shallow Hal wants a gal". During a dinner date, Rosemary tells Hal she has been asked by the Peace Corps to go on a 14-month mission in Kiribati. Mauricio phones Hal and says the trigger phrase, breaking the hypnosis. Mauricio then arrives at the restaurant and drags Hal out before he can see the real Rosemary, before telling him the truth about Tony's hypnotherapy. Hal does not believe him until he runs into Katrina, a woman who initially appeared beautiful to him but is now very physically unattractive. Hal begins to avoid Rosemary, who becomes depressed as a result. Jill, having  observed Hal overcoming his shallow nature through his relationship with Rosemary, develops an interest in him and invites him out for dinner. While on the date with Jill, Hal realizes his true feelings for Rosemary who has, coincidentally, arrived at the same restaurant with her family and sees the two sitting together. Assuming the worst, Rosemary leaves in tears. Not recognizing Rosemary, Hal walks right by her on his way to a payphone to call her and reassure her of his feelings. Confused and distraught, Rosemary insults him and effectively breaks up with him.

Five days later, Steve informs Hal that Rosemary’s ex-boyfriend and Peace Corps partner, Ralph, wants to be in a relationship with her again. Hal attempts to find Rosemary, but instead encounters a young patient named Cadence at the hospital where Rosemary volunteers. Due to the hypnosis, Hal had previously seen Cadence as a perfect little girl, but now sees that she is severely burned. Inspired by Cadence, Hal changes his views on outer beauty in general and goes after Rosemary. Mauricio confesses that he stopped Hal's hypnosis out of envy towards his happiness; he has an inoperable vestigial tail which has prevented him from ever getting close to a woman. Hal convinces Mauricio to accept his abnormality.

Hal heads to the Peace Corps recruiting office and confronts Ralph, believing he and Rosemary have gotten back together. Ralph informs Hal that he and Rosemary are not together and that Rosemary's parents are throwing her a farewell party (to which Ralph was not invited). Hal, Mauricio, Ralph and Ralph's friend Li'iBoy arrive at the home of Rosemary's parents. Rosemary initially rebuffs Hal's presence, but then accepts his apology when Hal professes his love for her. Rosemary informs Hal she is still leaving on her Peace Corps mission. Hal says he is coming, too, having just been sworn into the Peace Corps by Li'iBoy. Hal and Rosemary reconcile, and he tries to carry her bridal-style to the car, but finds he cannot lift her. Moved by his gesture and effort, she triumphantly carries him instead. As they drive off, Mauricio meets a woman who loves dogs and the two walk off together as he wags his tail.

Cast 

 Jack Black as Hal Larson
 Gwyneth Paltrow as Rosemary "Rosie" Shanahan
 Jason Alexander as Mauricio Wilson
 Joe Viterelli as Steve Shanahan
 Jill Christine Fitzgerald as Mrs. Shanahan
 Tony Robbins as Himself
 Bruce McGill as Reverend Larson
 Molly Shannon as Mrs. Mary Larson (uncredited)
 Sasha Neulinger as young Hal
 Susan Ward as Jill
 Rene Kirby as Walt
 Kyle Gass as Artie
 Laura Kightlinger as Jen
 Brooke Burns as Katrina
 Sayed Badreya as Dr. Sayed
 Zen Gesner as Ralph
 Joshua Shintani as Li’iBoy
 Ron Darling as other Li'iBoy
 Sascha Knopf as gorgeous Tanya
 Nan Martin as Nurse Tanya Peeler
 Mary Wigmore as Cute Tiffany
 Rob Moran as second Tiffany
 Michael Corrente as homeless man #2
 Darius Rucker as restaurant maitre d'
 Manon Von Gerkan as Lindy
 Erinn Bartlett as Bella

Production 

Writer Sean Moynihan is legally blind and was inspired by Tony Robbins to write the script. Earlier versions of the story did not include Robbins' character; instead, a psychic was responsible for Hal's change of view.

In December 1999 Paltrow was in talks to star. The Farrelly brothers tried unsuccessfully to get Garry Shandling to star as Mauricio before Jason Alexander was cast. 

Production was moved up in order to get the film completed before July 1 and a threatened Screen Actors Guild strike.
Filming took place in Charlotte, North Carolina.

The Farrelly Brothers defended the movie and its plot to critics, arguing it was more than a mere "fat joke" type of movie and was instead one that had a strong message about "inner beauty".

Gwyneth Paltrow played both roles, slim and fat Rosemary (except for a couple of close-up shots of fat Rosemary below the neck, which were played by her body double Ivy Snitzer), and had to wear a specially designed 25-pound fatsuit and prosthetic make-up. She later admitted that she did not enjoy partaking in production of the movie, in particular dreading having to wear the fat suit and makeup. The prosthetic make-up effects and body suits for Rosemary, Rosemary's mother, and all of the secondary characters were designed and created by Tony Gardner and his company Alterian, Inc.

Reception

Box office
In its opening weekend at the U.S. box office, Shallow Hal grossed $22.5 million, opening at #2 behind Monsters, Inc.. It grossed a total of $141.1 million, of which $70.7 million was in the United States.

Critical response
 
On Rotten Tomatoes, the film has a rating of 50%, based on 131 reviews, and an average rating of 5.5/10. The site's critical consensus reads, "While surprisingly sweeter and warm-hearted than previous Farrelly outings, Shallow Hal is also less funny and more bland." On Metacritic, it has a score of 48% based on reviews from 33 critics, indicating "mixed or average reviews". Audiences polled by CinemaScore gave the film an average grade of "C+" on an A+ to F scale.

Roger Ebert of the Chicago Sun-Times  gave it 3 out of 4 and called it "Often very funny, but it is also surprisingly moving at times."
A. O. Scott of The New York Times called it a series of fat jokes turned "into a tender fable and a winning love story"

Todd McCarthy of Variety wrote: "With the relatively untested Black coming on awfully strong, the lack of directorial finesse lets the enterprise down, creating some clunky scenes and dead air where laughs might have been expected."

Awards
The film was nominated at the 2002 Teen Choice Awards as Choice Movie: Comedy and its leads were nominated Choice Movie: Comedy Actor (Jack Black) and Choice Movie: Comedy Actress (Gwyneth Paltrow).

Home media
Shallow Hal was released on VHS and DVD in July 2002, and topped the rental charts the week it was released. It also performed well on Pay Per View. Fox released the film only 30 (rather than 45) days after its debut on DVD and video, and it became the top performing PPV title of 2002.

References

External links 

 
 
 

2001 films
2000s fantasy comedy films
2001 romantic comedy films
20th Century Fox films
American fantasy comedy films
American romantic comedy films
Body image in popular culture
Films about obesity
Films directed by the Farrelly brothers
Films about hypnosis
Films set in Montana
Films shot in Massachusetts
Films shot in North Carolina
Films with screenplays by the Farrelly brothers
2000s English-language films
2000s American films